Fresnedillas de la Oliva is a municipality of the autonomous community of Madrid in central Spain. It has a population of 1,581 inhabitants (INE, 2011).

See also 

 Imperial Route of the Community of Madrid

References

External links
 Web Information of Fresnedillas

Municipalities in the Community of Madrid